James "Jimmie" Simpson (1873 – September 24, 1938) was a British-Canadian trade unionist, printer, journalist and left-wing politician in Toronto, Ontario. He was a longtime member of Toronto's city council and served as Mayor of Toronto in 1935, the first member of the Cooperative Commonwealth Federation to serve in that capacity. He was also a member of the Orange Order in Canada.

Early life
Simpson was born in Lancashire, England and immigrated to Canada at the age of 14. Never attending high school, Simpson worked selling newspapers at the age of 10 and then began working for a grocer at the age of 13 before moving to Canada where he worked in a tin factory before joining the printing trade.

Career

Printing trade and journalism 
In 1892, Simpson was one of 27 members of the Typographical Union on strike against the Toronto News. The strikers, including Simpson, founded the Evening Star on November 3, 1892, as a strike paper. For ten years, Simpson served as the Star City Hall reporter including nine years as the paper's municipal editor. He subsequently became editor of a labour newspaper.

In 1900, Simpson and eight others founded the Ruskin Literary and Debating Society. He served as its first president. Today, it is Canada's oldest debating society.

Labour leader 
Simpson went on to become a labour leader and was the vice-president of the Toronto and District Trades and Labour Council at the turn of the century and also served three terms as vice-president of the Trades and Labour Congress of Canada between 1904 and 1936.

Labour Party 

As a socialist labour politician, he ran in the May 1902 Ontario election in Toronto. As a candidate for the newly-formed Socialist Party of Canada, he ran in Toronto North in the 1905 Ontario provincial election and in a 1906 provincial by-election in Toronto and in the 1908 provincial election, all unsuccessfully.

He was elected and served as a Toronto school board trustee, 1905–10.

He ran for mayor of Toronto in the 1908 Toronto municipal election as a Socialist but was not elected.

He was elected to the Toronto Board of Control in 1914 with the highest vote total ever given a candidate up to that time and sat on the Board of Control again from 1930 to 1934.

He was one of the co-leaders of the Ontario Labour Party (Ontario section of the Canadian Labour Party) in the 1920s and a Labour candidate for the House of Commons of Canada in Parkdale in the 1921 Canadian federal election, in Toronto Northwest in 1925 and 1926 Canadian federal elections but was unable to win election to Parliament.

Simpson played a leading role in opposing Communists in the Labour Party. After Communists convinced the party to withdraw its nomination of Simpson as its candidate for Toronto city council's Board of Control in 1927, Simpson and his supporters quit the party leading to its collapse. They then formed the Toronto Labour Party, which explicitly excluded Communists from membership.

Mayor 
In the 1930s, he became a leading member of the Ontario CCF. In 1934 he ran as a CCF candidate for the Toronto Board of Control and was elected which set the stage for him to run for Mayor of Toronto in the 1935 municipal election. The only one of the city's newspapers to support him was the Toronto Daily Star. The other papers and both the Conservative and Liberal parties supported Simpson's opponent, Alderman Harry Hunt and accused the CCF of being anti-British and under Communist influence. Percy Parker, a leading Liberal, declared on the radio that "the bells of Moscow will ring when Simpson is elected mayor."

Simpson's personal popularity and the organization put together by the CCF and the trade union movement was enough to elect him making Toronto the largest city in North America to have elected a socialist mayor. As mayor, Simpson supported the campaign to boycott the 1936 Summer Olympics being held in Nazi Germany that summer.

Religion 
Simpson was a Methodist and Christian socialist who became active with the Epworth League movement at the age of 16 ultimately becoming president of the Epworth League Toronto Conference. He also served as president of the Toronto Methodist Young People's Union and the Toronto Methodists' Cycling Union. Simpson was intensely anti-Catholic which cost him the support of the Toronto Star. When he ran for re-election as mayor in 1936 this contributed to his defeat.

Death
Simpson was killed in 1938 when his car crashed into a streetcar.

References

Further reading
 Reasoning Otherwise: Leftists and the People's Enlightenment in Canada, 1890-1920. By Ian McKay. Toronto: Between the Lines, 2008.

External links
Address by Mayor Simpson to the Empire Club of Canada, January 10, 1935
The Canadian Encyclopedia: James Simpson 

Mayors of Toronto
Toronto city councillors
Canadian trade unionists
Labour candidates in the 1926 Canadian federal election
Canadian Christian socialists
1873 births
1938 deaths
Road incident deaths in Canada
Accidental deaths in Ontario
Methodist socialists
Toronto District School Board trustees